Khalil Qaiser was a Pakistani film director, producer and screenwriter. Between 1961 and 1967, he directed seven films including Clerk (1962), Doshiza (1962), Shaheed (1962) and Farangi (1964). He also wrote story of Fashion (1965).

Biography 
Most of his films revolve around politics and social issues. He was killed at his home by an unidentified person or a group of people in 1966.

As a film director, he created films criticising British rule in India.

Awards and recognition
Nigar Awards for Best Director in films Nagin (1959 film) and Shaheed in 1961.

Filmography

References

External links 
 

Year of birth missing
Year of death missing
Urdu-language film directors
Pakistani film directors
Nigar Award winners